The Goldcrest High School is a school in Latur and Vashi, Maharashtra, India, built by the Vilasrao Deshmukh Foundation. It is headed by Amit Deshmukh and Aditi Deshmukh. The school was built in 2009, and is affiliated to the Council For The Indian School Certificate Examinations and prepares students for the Indian Certificate of Secondary Education and the Indian School Certificate.

External links
 

Education in Latur
Schools in Maharashtra
Educational institutions established in 2010
2010 establishments in Maharashtra